Nicholas Hugh "Nick" Morris, OAM (born 16 August 1971) is an Australian wheelchair basketball player. He was born in the Victorian town of Wangaratta. He was a member of the Australian team that won gold at the 1996 Summer Paralympics in Atlanta, for which he received a Medal of the Order of Australia. He was also a member of the Australian wheelchair basketball squad at the 2000 Summer Paralympics. Morris was injured in a motorcycle accident at age 16 and credits his involvement in sport as the key to his rehabilitation.

Morris received an Australian Sports Medal in 2000 for his many years service to the Paralympic movement as a Basketball athlete.

In his professional capacity, Morris sat on the Australian Standards Committee for Access provisions (AS1428) and is a director of Morris Goding Accessibility Consulting. In 1999 he established "accessibility.com.au", a website dedicated to providing information about accessible venues, facilities, services, transport and news.

In 2006 Morris co-invented the Vulcan Wheel, ergonomically designed one-piece extruded aluminium wheelchair wheel for use in general travel and sport. The invention was featured on the ABC New Inventors program.

From 2003 to 2011, Morris was an advisor to the International Paralympic Committee on accessibility and universal design to bid and organising committees. In particular his work on the Sydney 2000 and Beijing 2008 Olympics and Paralympics.

From 2012 onwards Nick as a director of MGAC, continued to provide accessibility and Universal Design advice to events, major developments and infrastructure in Australia and internationally.

References

External links

 
 Disability Consultants Database Entry 

RMIT University alumni
Australian men's wheelchair basketball players
Paralympic wheelchair basketball players of Australia
Wheelchair basketball players at the 1996 Summer Paralympics
Wheelchair basketball players at the 2000 Summer Paralympics
Medalists at the 1996 Summer Paralympics
Paralympic gold medalists for Australia
Wheelchair category Paralympic competitors
Recipients of the Medal of the Order of Australia
Recipients of the Australian Sports Medal
People from Wangaratta
Sportsmen from Victoria (Australia)
1971 births
Living people
Paralympic medalists in wheelchair basketball